Tama is a monotypic genus of tree trunk spiders containing the single species, Tama edwardsi. It was first described by Eugène Simon in 1882, and has only been found in Spain, in Portugal, and in Algeria.

References

Hersiliidae
Spiders described in 1846
Spiders of Africa
Spiders of Europe
Taxa named by Eugène Simon